Božidar Drenovac (2 January 1922 – 24 July 2003) was a Serbian football player and manager.

Club career
He was born in Ćuprija in 1922.  Still young he joined Belgrade club SK Jugoslavija in 1936, making his senior debut in the 1938–39 Yugoslav First League. After the Second World War, he signed with the newly formed Red Star Belgrade that inherited most of the property and players of the now disbanded, SK Jugoslavija. He played with Red Star until 1948. Next he move to the biggest rivals, FK Partizan where he would play until 1953, achieving even more success by winning the national championship (1949) and Yugoslav cup (1952).

International career
He played one match for the Yugoslavia national football team on 14 September 1947 in Tirana, against Albania, for the Balkan Cup, a 4-2 win.

Managerial career
After retiring, he graduated in Economics, but never abandoned his passion for football, becoming a coach. His coaching career took him to countries like Tunisia, Greece, Kuwait, United Arab Emirates, Libya, but he also managed a number of Yugoslav top league clubs, such as NK Čelik Zenica, OFK Beograd, FK Borac Banja Luka or FK Sutjeska Nikšić.

References

External sources
 Profile at Reprezentacija.rs

1922 births
2003 deaths
People from Ćuprija
Association football defenders
Serbian footballers
Yugoslav footballers
Yugoslavia international footballers
SK Jugoslavija players
Red Star Belgrade footballers
FK Partizan players
Yugoslav First League players
Serbian football managers
Yugoslav football managers
Panachaiki F.C. managers
OFK Beograd managers
Étoile Sportive du Sahel managers
FK Sutjeska Nikšić managers